Tarek Sadek is an Egyptian bridge player.

Bridge accomplishments

Wins

 North American Bridge Championships (3)
 Blue Ribbon Pairs (1) 2004 
 Mitchell Board-a-Match Teams (1) 2012 
 Vanderbilt (1) 2009

Runners-up

 Cavendish Invitational Pairs (2) 2002, 2003
 North American Bridge Championships (2)
 Roth Open Swiss Teams (1) 2008 
 von Zedtwitz Life Master Pairs (1) 2011

Notes

External links

Egyptian contract bridge players